Sporting Cultural Club Al-Oruba Zabid is a Yemeni football club based in San‘a’, Yemen.  The club was founded in 2008.

Club history
Al-Oruba Club is the team advanced in the Yemeni League in the football. A new club with a long history is the result of integrating the Al-Amn Al-Markazi Club, a Al-Sbaeen Club sport, and Kaalaty sports history:

Al-Qadisiyya Club in the year 1977.
PHYSICAL ACTIVITY Central Yemeni security forces in 1980.
Al-Mithaq Club in 1997.
Al-Sbaeen Club in 2004.
Al-Amn Al-Markazi Club in 2006.
Al-Oruba Club in 2008.

Seasons

Achievements
Yemeni League: 1
2010–11
Yemeni Super Cup: 1
 2011

Performance in AFC competitions
AFC Cup: 1 appearance
 2012 (group stage)

Current first team squad

See also
 2010–11 season
 2011–12 season

External links
 goalzz.com
 Official website 

  
Football clubs in Yemen
Association football clubs established in 2008
Sport in Sanaa
2008 establishments in Yemen